Tropidophis bucculentus, also known commonly as the Navassa Island dwarf boa, is a nonvenomous dwarf boa species endemic to Navassa Island in the Caribbean Sea. There are no subspecies that are recognized as being valid.

Geographic range
The type locality given for T. bucculentus is "Navassa Id."

Description

Reproduction
T. bucculentus is an ovoviviparous species.

Conservation status
T. bucculentus is possibly extinct. The species became a casualty of human interference and feral predators, such as rats, cats, dogs, and goats that were introduced during the large-scale mining period on this small island during the 1800s.

References

Further reading

Bailey JR (1937). "A review of some recent Tropidophis material". Proceedings of the New England Zoölogical Club 16: 41–52. (Tropidophis bucculentus, new combination).
Cope (1868). "An Examination of the REPTILIA and BATRACHIA obtained by the Orton Expedition to Equador [sic] and the Upper Amazon, with notes on other Species". Proceedings of the Academy of Natural Sciences of Philadelphia 20: 96–140. (Ungalia bucculenta, new species, p. 129).
Hedges SB (2002). "Morphological variation and the definition of species in the snake genus Tropidophis (Serpentes, Tropidophiidae)". Bulletin of the Natural History Museum. Zoology Series (London). 68 (2): 83–90. (Tropidophis bucculentus).
Powell R (1999). "Herpetology of Navassa Island, West Indies". Caribbean Journal of Science 35 (1–2): 1–13.
Schwartz A, Thomas R (1975). A Check-list of West Indian Amphibians and Reptiles. Carnegie Museum of Natural History Special Publication No. 1. Pittsburgh, Pennsylvania: Carnegie Museum of Natural History. 216 pp. (Tropidophis melanurus bucculentus, p. 194).
Thomas R (1966). "A Reassessment of the Herpetofauna of Navassa Island". Journal of the Ohio Herpetological Society 5 (3): 73–89. (Tropidophis melanurus bucculentus, new taxonomic status, p. 83).

Tropidophiidae
Endemic fauna of Navassa Island
Reptiles described in 1868